Exmortus is an American melodic death metal band formed in 2002, whose lyrics mostly deal with battles and war.

Members

Current members
 Jadran "Conan" Gonzalez – guitars (2002–present), lead vocals (2003-2005, 2009–present)
 Phillip Nunez – bass, backing vocals (2016–present)
 Chase Becker – guitars (2017–present)
 Adrian Aguilar – drums (2018–present)

Past members
 "Kevin" – guitars, vocals (2002–2003)
 Balmore Lemus – vocals (2005–2009), bass (2005–2007), guitars (2007–2009)
 Tak Arayan – guitars (2003–2007)
 Sean Redline – guitars (2009–2012)
 "Frost Demon" – bass (2002–2005)
 Daniel Duarte – bass (2007–2011)
 Clodoaldo "Aldo" Bibiano – bass (2011–2013, 2014–2015)
 Jovanni Perez – bass (2013–2014)
 Mike Cosio – bass (2015–2016)
 "Taco Bell Dave" – drums (2002–2003)
 Mario "Mortus" Moreno – drums (2002–2017)
 David Rivera – guitars, backing vocals (2012–2017)
 Carlos Cruz – drums (2017–2018)

Timeline

Discography

Studio albums
 In Hatred's Flame (2008)
 Beyond the Fall of Time (2011)
 Slave to the Sword (2014)
 Ride Forth (2016)
 The Sound of Steel (2018)

Extended plays (EPs)
 Reign of the War Gods (2006)
 In Hatred's Flame (2007)
 Legions of the Undead (2019)

Singles 
 "Entombed with the Pharaohs" (2010)
 "Immortality Made Flesh" (2013)
 "Slave to the Sword" (2014)
 "For the Horde" (2015)
 "Relentless" (2015)
 "Death to Tyrants" (2015)
 "Appassionata" (2015)
 "Make Hate" (2018)
 "Feat of Flesh" (2018)
 "Victory of Death!" (2018)
 "Swallow Your Soul" (2019)
 "Beetlejuice" (2019)
 "Oathbreaker" (2022)

Demos
 Dawn of Apocalypse (2003)
 Onward to Battle (2004)
 Promo Demo (2006)

References

External links 

 
 
 Exmortus Bandcamp

2002 establishments in California
American melodic death metal musical groups
American thrash metal musical groups
Musical groups from California
Musical groups from Whittier, California
Musical quartets